Jakob Ammann (also Jacob Amman, Amann; 12 February 1644 – between 1712 and 1730) was an Anabaptist leader and namesake of the Amish religious movement.

Personal life 

The full facts about the personal life of Jacob Ammann are incomplete and have been mostly speculative up until recent decades. Since the late 1990s more research has filled in some of the gaps and a basic outline of his life is now conceivable.

Early life and family 
Jakob Ammann was born on 12 February 1644 in Erlenbach im Simmental, Canton of Bern, Switzerland, to Michael and Anna (née Rupp) Ammann. Erlenbach church records note the baptism of a Jacob Ammann on 12 February 1644, who was probably the Jakob Ammann from whom the Amish received their name. His grandfather has been identified as Ulrich Ammann. All three Ammanns were tailors. Jakob was third in a family of six children. He probably received limited formal education. On 37 official documents signed by Jakob, only his initials appear, with most of them having a nearby note that Jakob was not able to write, so he only "made his mark". However, on three documents, his signed name does appear, although twice it was probably written for him by someone else; once, with the same style of writing as his initials, appear the poorly formed letters "J. AMME", which is assumed to be his own writing. Because he asked for letters to be read in one meeting, it is assumed he was not able to read, or possibly only poorly. He did better financially than the average person of his time.

Jakob was married to Verena Stüdler, but very little is known of her beyond her name. They had at least one daughter and one son, Baltz.

Jakob’s father and one of his sisters also joined the Anabaptist movement. His brother Ulli, 18 years his junior, was also an Anabaptist and is known for his moderating tone in the attempts at reconciliation between the Amish and Reist sides.

Conversion to Anabaptism 
On 12 March 1671 he is noted as the sponsor for a baptism in the state church. In June 1680, government correspondence from Oberhofen asked counsel from authorities in Bern on how to deal with a Jakob Ammann who had "become infected with the Anabaptist sect". This is the first known reference to Ammann as an Anabaptist. This indicates a conversion to Anabaptism sometime between 1671 and 1680. Sometime between his conversion and 1693 he was ordained to the ministry, possibly by Hans Reist, who would later become one of his greatest opponents.

By 1693, Ammann had moved from Switzerland to Heidolsheim, Alsace, where his father died and was buried in the neighboring village of Baldenheim. Apparently shortly after the death of his father, he moved to the head of the valley at La Petite Lièpvre (Klein Leberau), near Markirch (today Sainte-Marie-aux-Mines), Alsace, remaining there until October 1712 when all the Anabaptists in the area were expelled by an edict  of Louis XIV. After this date, no more records concerning Jakob Ammann have been found. He probably went to live with friends or relatives somewhere in Lower Alsace.

Death 
The date and place of Ammann's death are unknown, but in 1730 his daughter requested baptism in the Reformed Church in Erlenbach and stated that her father had died. It is not recorded when or where the death had occurred. Ammann's involvement in church matters had dropped off considerably before his disappearance from the records in 1712, possibly from old age, since he would have been approaching 70 years of age when he moved away from the Sainte-Marie-aux-Mines area.

Theology and practice 
Because of scarcity of materials, very little is known of Jakob Ammann’s teaching and day-to-day life. Three letters comprise the whole of his first-hand accounts of his thoughts.  Other letters accuse Jakob of teaching or holding various viewpoints, but since many of these letters were written by his opponents it is not clear how much bias the accusations contain.

From Jakob’s letters, it can be learned that he was a firm disciplinarian, uncompromising in what he believed, and expected others to "conform to the teachings of Christ and His apostles".  His rejection of the "good-hearted" stemmed from his belief that whoever accepted the "true saving faith" would be baptized upon that faith, cost what it may. They would "forsake the world" and practice a very practical separation in their everyday life. Jakob was willing to disregard longstanding customs and practices if they were not founded on God’s Word. He denied that he was trying to start a "new faith". He believed in a new birth experience that would radically change a person.  He wrote:

In practical matters, he stood opposed to long hair on men, shaved beards, and clothing that manifested pride.  Liars were to be excommunicated. Ammann, unlike most Amish married men of today, however, had a mustache, which is largely forbidden today in the faith.

Schism 
Jakob Ammann is known because of his prominent involvement in a schism among the Swiss Brethren that began in 1693. Until recent decades, he was often heavily blamed for the division, being portrayed as an angry, harsh, and demanding leader who imposed his views on others. With the publication of some of the correspondence from the period (beginning in 1950, with Mast’s "Amish Letters") and the uncovering of new evidence, Ammann’s reputation has received a more positive appraisal among some researchers. Because of their prominent roles, Jakob Ammann and Hans Reist have been used to characterize the two sides of the schism, but the issues were broader than the two most prominent men involved.

Background 
In the mid-1600s, a fresh influx of converts came into Swiss Anabaptism. The Reformed pastor at Burgdorf even complained that half of the people in the villages in his area were either Anabaptist or deeply sympathetic to their cause. These fresh converts—zealous for their new faith—were in fact a sort of new movement within Swiss Anabaptism. Of the nearly 200 surnames among the Amish in the 1690s, only a very few were found in the Reist side, indicating that the two sides formed mostly around two groups of people with different origins. Because of persecution, many Swiss Brethren families had emigrated or been evicted from Swiss territory into the Alsace and Palatinate before the division. The civil authorities tended to be more lenient in the new locations, and in some cases welcomed the newcomers as they were looking for people to develop their lands. This emigration tended to create a different environment than the Swiss who had not emigrated were experiencing, making some of the issues come to the fore.

Another important aspect in the schism was a conference held at Ohnenheim, Alsace, by several Swiss Brethren ministers and elders in 1660, in which they formally adopted the Dordrecht Confession of Faith that had been drawn up by Dutch Mennonites. Until this time, the Swiss Brethren (who did not use the name "Mennonite" for themselves) had no official confession of faith beyond the Schleitheim Confession. The Dordrecht Confession contained two points that the Swiss Brethren had not historically practiced: foot washing (Article XI) and social avoidance (including not eating meals with those who had been shunned, Article XVII). Swiss Brethren had practiced excommunication and a refusal to "eat" the [Lord's Supper] with those banned, but their avoidance did not include refraining from eating regular meals with those in the bann. These two issues, foot washing and not eating "physical" meals with the excommunicated, would be at the core of the schism.

Beginning 
In 1693, Jakob Ammann, "together with the ministers and elders," sent a general letter to people within the Swiss Brethren congregations, asking for a meeting in which he wanted clarification about where they stood on three issues: 1) Shunning those who had been banned, 2) whether liars should be excommunicated, and 3) if people could be saved who did not follow God’s word. This last issue was referring to the "good-hearted", meaning those who sympathized with the Anabaptists and even helped them materially in times of persecution, but who would not take the step of rebaptism. Those siding with Ammann felt that these "good-hearted" people should not be looked upon and consoled as "saved" unless they took up the cross and followed Christ in rebaptism and obedience to his teachings.

Along with feetwashing, these three issues were at the core of the division. However, other issues surfaced during the discussions in the following years, including frequency of communion and how church discipline should be conducted. Another issue mentioned during the time of the schism was the establishment of stricter regulations concerning dress and beard styles. However, social avoidance of banned individuals was the most controversial of all the issues, and thus it has sometimes been erroneously considered as the only cause of the schism.

Excommunications 
Jakob Ammann and Nicolas Augsburger were chosen by a ministerial committee to travel to Switzerland for a meeting with church leaders to find out where the Swiss congregations stood on the disputed issues. At first, a few of the Swiss ministers agreed with Ammann’s view, but in a later meeting Hans Reist would not agree with social avoidance, using Matthew 15:17 as a basis for "what enters the mouth is no sin." Another meeting was called, in which Hans Reist did not show up, saying he was busy. At this point, Jakob Ammann became irritated (verdreiszlich) and then proceeded to announce that Hans Reist was excommunicated on six points. When Ammann questioned some of the other Swiss ministers at the meeting where they stood on the issues, they pleaded for time to consult with their congregations. Ammann saw this as a turning back, since some of them had previously expressed agreement with his side. He then proceeded to announce the excommunication of six of the present ministers. Amman and the four men with him then left "without shaking hands with anyone." These excommunications created a definite breach within the Swiss Brethren movement. The Reist side eventually excommunicated the Ammann side as well.

Attempts at reconciliation 
Within a few years, several attempts were made at reconciliation. In February 1700, Jakob Ammann and several of his co-ministers removed the ban from the Swiss ministers and excommunicated themselves in recognition that they had acted too rashly and had "grievously erred." They did not feel that they were in error concerning the issues they had brought up, but rather that they had not given sufficient time for the Reist side to consider the issues before excommunicating them.  Also, they felt that they should not have excommunicated the Swiss ministers on the spot, but should have consulted with the whole congregation before proceeding. However, while Hans Reist and some of the Swiss ministers appear to have accepted the repentance of Ammann and his co-workers, they held firm to their position of not accepting social shunning. Some of the other issues had been accepted by the Swiss ministers, but the main body of Amish and the Reist side were never able to reconcile on the issue of social shunning. 

Today in North America, the Amish and Mennonites (the Reist side became known as Mennonites after the schism; in a paradox, it was the Amish side that was pushing for the introduction of Dutch Mennonite ideas, but those opposing the ideas eventually became known as Mennonites) live side by side in many communities and work together peacefully in publishing, businesses, and charitable aid projects. However, official sharing of ministry and communion is rare among the most conservative groups of Old Order Amish and Mennonites. In more moderate groups, there remains little to no effect from the schism, with the exception of names of churches.

Notes

References

Further reading 
 Steven M. Nolt, A History of the Amish, rev. ed. (Intercourse, PA: Good Books, 2003)
 Ste Marie, Andrew V, Atnip, Mike, Grounded Upon God’s Word: The Life and Labors of Jakob Ammann (Cross Bearers Series) (Manchester, MI: Sermon on the Mount Publishing, 2020)

External links 

 Jakob Ammann at the Global Anabaptist Mennonite Encyclopedia Online

1644 births
18th-century deaths
People from Frutigen-Niedersimmental District
Swiss Christian religious leaders
Swiss Christian pacifists
17th-century Swiss people
18th-century Swiss people
17th-century Anabaptist ministers
18th-century Anabaptist ministers
Christian radicals
Swiss Amish people
Year of death unknown